Chorfa may refer to:
Sharif or Chérif (Darija: Chorfa), a traditional Arab title meaning "noble", "highborn" (for Sunnis, suggesting descent from Muhammad)
 one of several places in Algeria:
 Chorfa, Annaba, a municipality or commune in Annaba province, Algeria
 Chorfa, Bouïra, a municipality or commune in Bouïra province, Algeria
 Chorfa, Boumerdès, a village in Boumerdès province, Algeria
 Chorfa, Mascara, a municipality or commune in Mascara province, Algeria
 Chorfa, Chlef, a suburb of Chlef in Chlef province, Algeria